The Bornean flat-headed frog (Barbourula kalimantanensis) is a species of frog in the family Bombinatoridae. Although many salamanders are lungless, the Bornean flat-headed frog is the first frog known to have no lungs.

Djoko Iskandar, an Indonesian zoologist, first described the Bornean flat-headed frog based on a single specimen. However, he did not know the frog was lungless until he was in the field with David Bickford's expedition. Bickford et al. were able to dissect some of the specimens and discovered for the first time that the frogs had no lungs. The frog breathes entirely through its skin, and its internal organs (the stomach, spleen and the liver) take up much of the space which normally would be filled by the lungs. By retaining the lunglessness of their tadpole stage, the frogs are much flatter than typical frogs, which might help absorb oxygen and avoid being swept away in fast streams.

Description
It has a dorsoventrally flattened body with a broad head with a rounded snout. The limbs are robust and both hands and feet are fully webbed. The dorsal skin is smooth with small tubercles on the posterior end and the hind legs and the ventral skin is smooth. Its general colour is brown with black mottling.

Distribution and habitat
This aquatic frog lives in cold, clear, and fast rivers in remote areas of the rain forests of Kalimantan, the Indonesian part of the island of Borneo. It is known from only two localities, both in the Kapuas River basin.

Status
The Bornean flat-headed frog is listed as Endangered by the IUCN. It is threatened by habitat loss from severe degradation of the river habitats because of increased turbidity and toxic metals used in mining and other negative consequences of development on the island.

See also 
Lungless salamander

References

External links
CBC: Gasp! Scientists find first lungless frog
 http://calphotos.berkeley.edu/imgs/512x768/1111_1111/1111/7442.jpeg
 Science Daily article
 New Scientist article

Barbourula
Amphibians of Indonesia
Endemic fauna of Borneo
Endemic fauna of Indonesia
Taxonomy articles created by Polbot
Amphibians described in 1978
Amphibians of Borneo